Seán Cummings is a Canadian film and television industry professional and former playwright, actor, producer, and director from Vancouver, British Columbia, Canada. He was born in Ontario on January 17, 1968.

Cummings' first full-length play, "Chasing Home"  was produced at the Vancouver Playhouse by the Frank Theatre Company and the Vancouver Playhouse Theatre Company in Vancouver, BC in 2012.  His first published work appears as the preface to C.E. Gatchalian's "Crossing"  and other Plays - Lethe Press (Feb. 6 2011).

He is a founder of Meta for Theatre Company and served as co-artistic director from 2004 to 2008, later serving as artistic director of Frank Theatre Company from 2008 to 2012.  In 2012 he returned to Meta for Theatre as the company's Artistic Producer.

As a director, Cummings is known as the director of the stage versions of Lambda Literary Award nominee C. E. Gatchalian's plays Crossing, Broken and Falling In Time.

As an actor, his roles have included Jason in Take Me Out and Bertram in All's Well That Ends Well In late 2007, he delivered a critically acclaimed performance in the Vancouver production of Bent, a play about homosexuals in Germany under the Nazis. In early 2008, he played David in a revival of Brad Fraser's Poor Super Man.

References

External links
 
 

1968 births
Living people
Canadian male stage actors
Canadian male film actors
Canadian theatre directors
Canadian gay actors
Canadian gay writers
LGBT theatre directors
Male actors from Vancouver
Writers from Vancouver
21st-century Canadian dramatists and playwrights
Canadian LGBT dramatists and playwrights
Canadian male dramatists and playwrights
21st-century Canadian male writers
Canadian artistic directors
Gay dramatists and playwrights
21st-century Canadian LGBT people